Beijing Radio and Television Station (BRTV), formerly Beijing Media Network (BMN), is a government-owned television network in China. It broadcasts from Beijing. The channel is available only in Chinese.

Beijing Media Network was founded on 16 May 1979. It covers China, Asia and North America. China Central Television was called Beijing Television from 1958 to 1978.

In October 2022, BRTV took a minority ownership stake in Kuaishou.

List of BRTV television channels

The group has ten primary channels, which were formerly numbered sequentially (BTV-1, BTV-2, etc.), all except the International Channel (bilingual in English and Mandarin) are using Mandarin:

Additionally, the network provides:
BRTV Theater Channel TV Drama Channel (local digital pay channel)
Loving Home Shopping Channel TV Shopping Channel (local digital pay channel)
Mobile TV Channel
Youyou Babies Channel (satellite digital pay channel)
Car Fan Channel (satellite digital pay channel)
Chinese Specialty Channel (satellite digital pay channel)
Four Sea Fishing Channel (satellite digital pay channel)
Global Travel Channel (satellite digital pay channel)
Ecoenvironment Channel (satellite digital pay channel)
Dynamic Music Channel (local digital pay channel)
Home Purchase Channel (local digital pay channel)
Age of Go Channel (local digital pay channel)

Former channels 

 BRTV Youth, 1 January 2002-1 January 2023

See also
Chinese cardboard bun hoax
Radio Beijing Corporation

References

External links
 

Television networks in China
Television channels and stations established in 1979
Mass media in Beijing
State media